"Heaven and Hell" is the title track of Black Sabbath's ninth studio album. The music was written mainly by guitarist Tony Iommi, but – as with almost all Sabbath albums – credit is given to the entire band. The lyrics were written entirely by newcomer Ronnie James Dio.

The song has been performed by several bands of which Iommi and Dio were members including Black Sabbath, Dio, and Heaven & Hell.

Details
Keyboardist Geoff Nicholls, who was a session keyboard player during the recording of the album, is said to have been responsible for this song's bassline. The bassline closely resembles that of "Mainline Riders" by Quartz, of which Nicholls was a former member. Geezer Butler was not available during initial recording of the song in late 1979.

Performed live by Black Sabbath, Dio and Heaven & Hell, the song was often stretched out with an extended guitar solo, audience participation, ad-libbed lyrics, or additional lyrics regarding angelic and demonic apparitions and personal judgment.

Many later Sabbath lineups included this song in live sets, during which it was variously sung by Ian Gillan, Glenn Hughes, Ray Gillen, and Tony Martin. An official live recording, featuring Martin on vocals, featured on 1995's Cross Purposes Live. Judas Priest frontman Rob Halford sang the song with Sabbath on 14 and 15 November 1992, when he filled in at two concerts.

"Heaven and Hell" was ranked No. 11 in Martin Popoff's book The Top 500 Heavy Metal Songs of All Time. Popoff compiled the book by asking thousands of fans, musicians, and journalists to nominated their favourite metal songs. Almost 18,000 individual votes were tallied and entered into a database from which the final rankings were derived.

The song was named the 81st best hard rock song of all time by VH1. It was ranked the eighth best Black Sabbath song by Rock - Das Gesamtwerk der größten Rock-Acts im Check. In 2020, Kerrang ranked the song number three on their list of the 20 greatest Black Sabbath songs, and in 2021, Louder Sound ranked the song number two on their list of the 40 greatest Black Sabbath songs.

The song's intro was used during The Freddie Mercury Tribute Concert to introduce Tony Iommi.

Lyrics

In an interview for VH1's "Heavy: The Story of Metal", Dio stated that the song is about the ability of each human being to choose between doing good and doing evil; essentially, that each person has "heaven and hell" inside themselves.

References

Black Sabbath songs
1980 songs
Songs written by Tony Iommi
Songs written by Geezer Butler
Songs written by Bill Ward (musician)
Songs written by Ronnie James Dio
Song recordings produced by Martin Birch